Samuel Caleb Hunt (born October 10, 1986) is an American actor best known for his reoccurring role as Greg "Mouse" Gerwitz in the television series Chicago Fire and Chicago P.D., playing Xavier Rosen in the third season of Empire, and for starring in the 2018 film Unbroken: Path to Redemption, in which he portrayed the World War II veteran and evangelist Louis Zamperini.

Filmography

Film

Television

References

External links

American male film actors
American male television actors
Male actors from Chicago
Living people
1986 births